Muhsin Ertuğrul (28 February 1892 – 29 April 1979), also known as  Ertuğrul Muhsin Bey, was a Turkish actor and director.

Muhsin Ertuğrul, who had important contributions to both Turkish theatre and Turkish cinema, was born in İstanbul on 28 February 1892. His first performance in theatre was in 1909 with the role of "Bob" in Sherlock Holmes by Arthur Conan Doyle. He ran the Darülbedayi Theatre in Istanbul from its opening in 1914.

He married in 1929 Neyyire Neyir (née Münire Eyüp), one of the first ever Turkish actresses, who debuted in the 1923 movie Ateşten Gömlek, directed by himself. The marriage lasted until Neyyire's death in 1943. Ertuğrul then married Handan Uran (born 1927) in 1950. A stage actress, she starred in her only movie, the 1953 Halıcı Kız, once again directed by Ertuğrul himself. She survived her husband's death in 1979.

Death
During his stay in Izmir following the honorary doctor ceremony, Ertuğrul died of a heart attack at the age of 87 on 29 April 1979. He was buried in Zincirlikuyu Cemetery in Istanbul.

Awards
Muhsin Ertuğrul was bestowed the title Honorary Doctor by Ege University on 23 April 1979 in recognition for his contribution to the theatre and cinema of Turkey.

Legacy
Three theatres in Turkey are named in his honor: the Harbiye Muhsin Ertuğrul Stage and Bahçeşehir Muhsin Ertuğrul Theatre in Istanbul and the Muhsin Ertuğrul Stage in Ankara.

Filmography

Director
 Halıcı Kız (1953) (The Carpetmaker Girl)
 Evli mi bekar mı (1951)
 Kızılırmak karakoyun (1946)
 Yayla kartalı (1945) (The Plateau Eagle)
 Kıskanç (1942) (The Jealous One)
 Kahveci güzeli (1941) (The Handsome Coffee Shop-Keeper)
 Akasya palas (1940)
 Nasreddin Hoca düğünde (1940) (Nasreddin Hodja at the Wedding Feast)
 Şehvet kurbanı (1940) (The Victim of Lust)
 Tosun paşa (1939)
 Allah'ın cenneti (1939) (The Paradise of God)
 Bir kavuk devrildi (1939)
 Aynaroz kadısı (1938) (The Judge of Athos)
  (1934)
 Leblebici Horhor Ağa (1934)
 Milyon avcıları (1934)
 Cici berber (1933) (The Pretty Barber)
 Nasit dolandırıcı (1933) (Nasit, the Swindler)
 Karım beni aldatırsa (1933) (If My Wife Betrays Me)
 Kakos dromos (1933) (The Wrong Road) (USA)
 Söz bir, Allah bir (1933)
 Bir millet uyanıyor (1932) (A Nation Is Awakening)
 İstanbul sokaklarında (1931) (In the Streets of Istanbul)
 The Courier of Angola (1929)
 Kaçakçılar (1929) (The Smugglers)
 Ankara postası (1928)
 Bir sigara yüzünden (1928) (For a Cigarette)
 Sözde kızlar (1924)
 Leblebici Horhor Ağa (1924)
 Ateşten Gömlek (1923)
 Kız Kulesinde bir facia (1923)
 Boğaziçi esrarı (1922) Nur baba (Turkey: Turkish title), (The Bosphorus Mystery) (International title)
 İstanbul'da bir facia-i aşk (1922) (A Love Tragedy In Istanbul)
 İstanbul'da ıstırap (1922)
 Die Teufelsanbeter (1920) (The Devil Worshippers)
 The Black Tulip Festival (1920) (co-director, with Marie Luise Droop)
 Samson (1919) aka Istırap (Turkey: Turkish title)

Actor
 Kıskanç (1942) (The Jealous One)
 Şehvet kurbanı (1940) (The Victim of Lust)
 The Courier of Angola (1929)
 Ankara postası (1928)
 Die Frau mit den Millionen - 1. Der Schuß in der Pariser Oper (1923)
 Ateşten gömlek (1923)
 Kız Kulesinde bir facia (1923)
 Boğaziçi esrarı (1922) Nur baba (Turkey: Turkish title), The Bosphorus Mystery (International title)
 İstanbul'da ıstırap (1922)
 Samson (1919) Istırap (Turkey: Turkish title)

See also
 Muhsin Ertuğrul Stage, a theatre venue in Mamak, Ankara
 Bahçeşehir Muhsin Ertuğrul Theatre, a theatre venue in Bahçeşehir, Başakşehir, Istanbul
 Harbiye Muhsin Ertuğrul Stage, a theatre venue in Harbiye, Şişli, Istanbul

References

External links
 Istanbul City Theatres - Muhsin Ertuğrul
 

1892 births
People from Yalova
Male actors from Istanbul
Turkish male stage actors
Turkish male film actors
Turkish theatre directors
Turkish film directors
1979 deaths
Burials at Zincirlikuyu Cemetery